Philip Vernon may refer to:

Philip E. Vernon (1905–1987), British psychologist and intelligence researcher
Philip A. Vernon (born 1950), psychologist and intelligence researcher, son of Philip E. Vernon
Philip Vernon, a character in the 1972 Italian film Who Saw Her Die?

See also
Philip (disambiguation)
Vernon (disambiguation)